Akif Jafar Hajiyev (8 December 1937 – 3 February 2015) was an Azerbaijani mathematician. He served as the vice-president of the Azerbaijan National Academy of Sciences from 2013 until his death. From 2004 to 2013, he was the director of the Institute of Mathematics and Mechanics of National Academy of Sciences. He authored four books, in addition to numerous papers. By presidential decree, he was awarded the "Order of Glory" in 2004 and "Honored Worker of Science" in 2005.

A native of Baku, Hajiyev was best known for his work in the theory of multidimensional singular integrals.

References

1937 births
2015 deaths
Azerbaijani academics
20th-century Azerbaijani mathematicians
21st-century Azerbaijani mathematicians